Bill Priddle is a Canadian indie rock musician, currently working as co-lead vocalist and guitarist in the band Treble Charger. He has also been a member of Broken Social Scene, Don Vail and The Priddle Concern.

In 1992 he formed Treble Charger in Sault Ste. Marie, Ontario with Greig Nori, Rosie Martin and Morris Palter. The band released five studio albums, before Priddle departed in 2003. The band disbanded in 2006, and reformed in 2012 with Priddle rejoining.

Priddle released an album 6 May 2008 under the name The Priddle Concern.

References

External links
The Priddle Concern

1963 births
Broken Social Scene members
Canadian indie rock musicians
Canadian rock guitarists
Canadian male guitarists
Canadian rock singers
Living people
Musicians from Sault Ste. Marie, Ontario
Musicians from Toronto
20th-century Canadian guitarists
21st-century Canadian guitarists
20th-century Canadian male singers
Canadian singer-songwriters
21st-century Canadian male singers
Treble Charger members
Canadian male singer-songwriters